In chemistry, an amphoteric compound is a molecule or ion that can react both as an acid and as a base. What exactly this can mean depends on which definitions of acids and bases are being used.

One type of amphoteric species are amphiprotic molecules, which can either donate or accept a proton. This is what "amphoteric" means in Brønsted–Lowry acid–base theory. For example, amino acids and proteins are amphiprotic molecules because of their amine and carboxylic acid groups. Self-ionizable compounds like water are also amphiprotic.

Ampholytes are amphoteric molecules that contain both acidic and basic functional groups. For example, an amino acid  has both a basic group  and an acidic group , and exists as several structures in chemical equilibrium:

H2N-RCH-CO2H + H2O<=> H2N-RCH-COO- + H3O+<=> H3N+-RCH-COOH + OH-<=> H3N+-RCH-COO- + H2O

In approximately neutral aqueous solution (pH ≅ 7), the basic amino group is mostly protonated and the carboxylic acid is mostly deprotonated, so that the predominant species is the zwitterion . The pH at which the average charge is zero is known as the molecule's isoelectric point. Ampholytes are used to establish a stable pH gradient for use in isoelectric focusing.

Metal oxides which react with both acids as well as bases to produce salts and water are known as amphoteric oxides. Many metals (such as zinc, tin, lead, aluminium, and beryllium) form amphoteric oxides or hydroxides. Aluminium oxide is an example of an amphoteric oxide. Amphoterism depends on the oxidation states of the oxide. Amphoteric oxides include lead (II) oxide and zinc (II) oxide, among many others.

Etymology
Amphoteric is derived from the Greek word  meaning "both".  Related words in acid-base chemistry are amphichromatic and amphichroic, both describing substances such as acid-base indicators which give one colour on reaction with an acid and another colour on reaction with a base.

Amphiprotic molecules
According to the Brønsted-Lowry theory of acids and bases, acids are proton donors and bases are proton acceptors. An amphiprotic molecule (or ion) can either donate or accept a proton, thus acting either as an acid or a base. Water, amino acids, hydrogencarbonate ion (or bicarbonate ion) , dihydrogen phosphate ion , and hydrogensulfate ion (or bisulfate ion)  are common examples of amphiprotic species. Since they can donate a proton, all amphiprotic substances contain a hydrogen atom. Also, since they can act like an acid or a base, they are amphoteric.

Examples
The water molecule is amphoteric in aqueous solution. It can either gain a proton to form a hydronium ion , or else lose a proton to form a hydroxide ion .

Another possibility is the molecular autoionization reaction between two water molecules, in which one water molecule acts as an acid and another as a base.
H2O + H2O <=> H3O+ + OH-

The bicarbonate ion, is amphoteric as it can act as either an acid or a base:
As an acid, losing a proton: HCO3- + OH- <=> CO3^2- + H2O
As a base, accepting a proton: HCO3- + H+ <=> H2CO3 
Note: in dilute aqueous solution the formation of the hydronium ion, is effectively complete, so that hydration of the proton can be ignored in relation to the equilibria.

Other examples of inorganic polyprotic acids include anions of sulfuric acid, phosphoric acid, EDTA, and hydrogen sulfide that have lost one or more protons. In organic chemistry and biochemistry, important examples include amino acids and derivatives of citric acid.

Although an amphiprotic species must be amphoteric, the converse is not true. For example, a metal oxide such as zinc oxide, ZnO, contains no hydrogen and so cannot donate a proton. Nevertheless, it can act as an acid by reacting with the hydroxide ion, a base:
ZnO_{(s)}{} + 2OH- + H2O -> Zn(OH)_{4(aq)}^2-
This reaction is not covered by the Brønsted–Lowry acid–base theory. Because zinc oxide can also act as a base:
ZnO_{(s)}{} + 2H+ -> Zn^2+_{(aq)}{} + H2O,
it is classified as amphoteric rather than amphiprotic.

Oxides
Zinc oxide (ZnO) reacts with both acids and with bases:
ZnO + \overset{acid}{H2SO4} -> ZnSO4 + H2O
ZnO + \overset{base}{2 NaOH} + H2O -> Na2[Zn(OH)4]
This reactivity can be used to separate different cations, for instance zinc(II), which dissolves in base, from manganese(II), which does not dissolve in base.

Lead oxide (PbO):
 PbO + \overset{acid}{2 HCl} -> PbCl2 + H2O
 PbO + \overset{base}{2 NaOH} + H2O -> Na2[Pb(OH)4]

Aluminium oxide:
 Al2O3 + \overset{acid}{6 HCl} -> 2 AlCl3 + 3 H2O
 Al2O3 + \overset{base}{2 NaOH} + 3 H2O -> 2 Na[Al(OH)4] (hydrated sodium aluminate)

Stannous oxide (SnO):
 SnO + \overset{acid}{2 HCl} <=> SnCl2 + H2O
 SnO + \overset{base}{4 NaOH} + H2O <=> Na4[Sn(OH)6]

Vanadium dioxide:
VO2 + \overset{acid}{2 HCl} -> VOCl2 + H2O
4 VO2 + \overset{base}{2 NaOH} -> Na2V4O9 + H2O

Some other elements which form amphoteric oxides are gallium, indium, scandium, titanium, zirconium, chromium, iron, cobalt, copper, silver, gold, germanium, antimony, bismuth, beryllium, and tellurium.

Hydroxides
Aluminium hydroxide is also amphoteric:
Al(OH)3 + \overset{acid}{3 HCl} -> AlCl3 + 3 H2O
Al(OH)3 + \overset{base}{NaOH} -> Na[Al(OH)4]

Beryllium hydroxide:
Be(OH)2 + \overset{acid}{2 HCl} -> BeCl2 + 2 H2O
Be(OH)2 + \overset{base}{2 NaOH} -> Na2[Be(OH)4]

Chromium hydroxide:
Cr(OH)3 + \overset{acid}{3 HCl} -> CrCl3 + 3H2O
Cr(OH)3 + \overset{base}{NaOH} -> Na[Cr(OH)4]

See also

 Ate complex
 Isoelectric point
 Zwitterion

References

 
Acid–base chemistry
Chemical properties
General chemistry